The abbreviation ICMI may refer to:

Indonesian Association of Muslim Intellectuals (Ikatan Cendekiawan Muslim Indonesia)
International Commission on Mathematical Instruction
International Conference on Men's Issues
International Cyanide Management Institute